Tarrar (also Romanized as Ţarrār) is a village in Dalankuh Rural District, in the Central District of Faridan County, Isfahan Province, Iran. At the 2006 census, its population was 477, in 113 families.

References 

Populated places in Faridan County